Kritchana Yod-Ard (born 7 June 1988) is a professional footballer from Thailand.

Honours

Club
Police United
 Thai Division 1 League Champions (1) : 2009

References

External links
 Goal.com 
 

1988 births
Living people
Kritchana Yod-Ard
Kritchana Yod-Ard
Association football goalkeepers
Kritchana Yod-Ard
Kritchana Yod-Ard
Kritchana Yod-Ard
Kritchana Yod-Ard